The Two Mrs. Grenvilles is a 1987 television miniseries based on Dominick Dunne's 1985 novel of the same name and dramatizing the sensational killing of William Woodward, Jr.  by his wife, Ann Woodward in 1955. Directed by John Erman, the miniseries stars Ann-Margret, Elizabeth Ashley, Stephen Collins and Claudette Colbert in her final television role.

Cast
 Ann-Margret as Ann Arden Grenville
 Elizabeth Ashley as Babette
 Bruce Boa as Hunnicutt
 Claudette Colbert as Alice Grenville
 Stephen Collins as Billy Grenville Jr.
 Peter Eyre as Basil Plante
 Michael Feinstein as Pianist
 Lewis Fiander as Lord Kingswood
 Penny Fuller as Cordelia
 Delena Kidd as Tuchy Bainbridge
 Alan Oppenheimer as Sam Rosenthal
 Siân Phillips as Duchess of Windsor
 Shane Rimmer as Doorman
 Rex Robbins as Cab Driver #1
 John Rubinstein as Bratsie
 Sam Wanamaker as  District Attorney

Awards and nominations
Emmy Awards (1987)

Won
Outstanding Achievement in Hairstyling for a Miniseries or a Special (For part II) - Marsha Lewis (hairstylist), Mike Lockey (hairstylist), Sydney Guilaroff (hairstylist for Ann-Margret)
Outstanding Art Direction for a Miniseries or a Special (For part II) - Malcolm Middleton (production designer), Herbert Westbrook (art director), Harry Cordwell (set decorator)

Nominated
Outstanding Costume Design for a Miniseries or a Special (For part I) - Nolan Miller (for Ann-Margret), Donald Brooks (for Claudette Colbert), Sue Yelland
Outstanding Lead Actress in a Miniseries or a Special - Ann-Margret
Outstanding Miniseries - Susan G. Pollock (executive producer), John Erman (supervising producer), Preston Fischer (producer)
Outstanding Sound Mixing for a Drama Miniseries or a Special (For part I) - John Asman (sound mixer), Neil Brody (sound mixer), Ken S. Polk (sound mixer), Peter Sutton (sound mixer)
Outstanding Supporting Actor in a Miniseries or a Special - Stephen Collins
Outstanding Supporting Actress in a Miniseries or a Special - Claudette Colbert

Golden Globes (1988)

Won 
Best Performance by an Actress in a Supporting Role in a Series, Mini-Series or Motion Picture Made for TV - Claudette Colbert

Nominated
Best Performance by an Actress in a Mini-Series or Motion Picture Made for TV - Ann-Margret

American Cinema Editors (1988)

Nominated 
Eddie Best Edited Episode from a Television Mini-Series (For part II) - Jerrold L. Ludwig

External links

 
 

Films directed by John Erman
American television films
1987 drama films
Films based on American novels
1980s American television miniseries
1987 television films
1987 films
Television shows based on American novels
Films scored by Marvin Hamlisch